The 1987 World Sportscar Championship season was the 35th season of FIA World Sportscar Championship racing.  It featured the 1987 FIA World Sports Prototype Championship which was contested over a ten race series that commenced on 22 March and ended on 27 September. The championship was open to FIA Group C Sports Prototypes, FIA Group C2 Sports Prototypes and IMSA GTP cars. Raul Boesel won the Drivers Championship, Fermin Velez  was awarded the FIA Cup for Group C2 Drivers, Silk Cut Jaguar won the Teams Championship and the FIA Cup for Group C2 Teams was awarded to Spice Engineering. Jaguar won 8 out of the 10 races and Porsche 2.

Schedule

Entries

Group C1

Group C2

Season results

Races

In order to be classified for points, a team had to complete 90% of the winner's distance. Further, drivers were required to complete at least 30% of their car's total race distance to qualify for championship points. Drivers forfeited points if they drove in more than one car during the race. Group C2 drivers earned extra championship points for any finish within the overall top ten positions.

Drivers championships
The respective driver championships only counted each driver's seven highest scores toward the final championship total.  Points not counted toward the driver's tally are marked with parenthesis.

World Sports Prototype Championship for Drivers

FIA Cup for Group C2 Drivers

Teams championships

World Sports Prototype Championship for Teams

1987 FIA Cup for Group C2 Teams

Points towards the 1987 FIA Cup for Group C2 Sports-Prototypes Teams were awarded to the top 10 Group C2 class finishers in the order of 20-15-12-10-8-6-4-3-2-1.

Only the best seven round results could be retained towards a Team's total.

References

External links
 Drivers points tables for the 1987 World Sports-Prototype Championship Retrieved from wspr-racing.com on 29 January 2009
 Teams points tables for the 1987 World Sports-Prototype Championship Retrieved from wspr-racing.com on 29 January 2009
 Race results for the 1987 World Sports-Prototype Championship Retrieved from wspr-racing.com on 29 January 2009
 www.racingsportscars.com

 
World Sportscar Championship seasons
Sports